Mohammed Bushnaq (May 28, 1934 – May 26, 2017) is a Palestinian artist of Bosniak origin noted for his paintings and sculpture. His daughter is the artist Suzan Bushnaq.

References

Other sources 
 sha3erjordan.net
 addustour.com, issue 683
 addustour.com, issue 860

Palestinian artists
1934 births
Palestinian people of Bosniak descent
People from Haifa
Palestine Technical University alumni